Sir Alfred John Gardener, KCMG CBE (6 February 1897 - 16 March 1985) was a British diplomat. He was Ambassador to Afghanistan from 1949 to 1951, and Ambassador to Syria from 1953 to 1957.

References

Ambassadors of the United Kingdom to Afghanistan
Ambassadors of the United Kingdom to Syria
1897 births
1985 deaths